Polasara (Sl. No.: 124) is a Vidhan Sabha constituency of Ganjam district, Odisha.

This constituency includes Polasara, Buguda, Polasara block and Buguda block.

Elected Members

Three elections held during 2009 to 2019.
Elected members from the Polasara constituency are:

 2019: (124): Srikanta Sahu (BJD)
 2014: (124): Srikanta Sahu (BJD)
 2009: (124): Niranjan Pradhan (BJD)

2019 Election Result

2014 Election Result
In 2014 election, Biju Janata Dal candidate Srikant Sahu defeated  Indian National Congress candidate Gokulananda Mallik by a margin of 21,217 votes.

Summary of results of the 2009 Election
In 2009 election, Biju Janata Dal candidate Niranjan Pradhan defeated Indian National Congress candidate Ram Krushna Patnaik by a margin of 11,322 votes.

Notes

References

Assembly constituencies of Odisha
Politics of Ganjam district